Pilsbryspira loxospira is a species of sea snail, a marine gastropod mollusk in the family Pseudomelatomidae, the turrids and allies.

Description
The length of the shell varies between 10 mm and 25 mm.

Distribution
This species occurs in the Pacific Ocean from Mexico to Nicaragua.

References

 H. A. Pilsbry and H. N. Lowe, West Mexican and Central American Mollusks Collected by H. N. Lowe, 1929-31; Proceedings of the Academy of Natural Sciences of Philadelphia Vol. 84 (1932), pp. 33-144

External links
 
 

loxospira
Gastropods described in 1932